The Mount Bulgar viper (Montivipera bulgardaghica), also called the Bulgardagh viper is a viper species endemic to the mountains of southern Turkey. Like all other vipers, it is venomous. No subspecies are currently recognized.

Description

Geographic range
It is found in the Bulgar Dagh (Bolkar Dagi) mountains, Nigde Province, south central Anatolia, Turkey.

The type locality given is "Cilician Taurus (Kar Boghaz, Bulgar Dagh, 2500 m) province Nigde" (= Karbogaz, Bolkar dagi Ulukişla, 8,200 ft), south central Anatolia, Turkey.

Conservation status
 This species is classified as Least Concern according to the IUCN Red List of Threatened Species.

It is also listed as a protected species (Appendix III) under the Berne Convention.

Taxonomy
This species was considered by Golay et al. (1993) to be a subspecies of M. xanthina, and was subsequently moved to the genus Montivipera by Nilson et al. (1999), who considered it to be a synonym of Montivipera xanthina.

References

Further reading

 Golay P, Smith HM, Broadley DG, Dixon JR, McCarthy CJ, Rage J-C, Schätti B, Toriba M. 1993. Endoglyphs and Other Major Venomous Snakes of the World: A Checklist. Geneva: Azemiops. 478 pp.
 Nilson G, Andrén C. 1985. Systematics of the Vipera xanthina complex (Reptilia: Viperidae). 3. Taxonomic status of the Bulgar Dagh viper in south Turkey. Journal of Herpetology 19 (2): 276-283. (Vipera bulgardaghica, new species)

External links

 

Montivipera
Reptiles of Turkey
Endemic fauna of Turkey
Reptiles described in 1985